Loi Hkilek or Loi Kyi-lek is a mountain of the Shan Hills, in Shan State, Burma.

Geography
Loi Hkilek is located about 11 km to the northeast of Möng Kyawt (Mongkyawt) in Mong Ton Township of Mongsat District.
Although this mountain is mentioned in the Imperial Gazetteer of India as "a 2,133 high mountain located in Mongkyawt District", its actual elevation is 1,973 m.

See also
List of mountains in Burma

References

External links
Google Books, The Physical Geography of Southeast Asia

Geography of Shan State
Mountains of Myanmar
Shan Hills